Marionia pellucida is a species of sea slug, a dendronotid nudibranch, a marine gastropod mollusc in the family Tritoniidae.

Distribution
This species was described from near Wasin, Kenya, East Africa, where it was dredged in 18 m of water.

References

Tritoniidae
Gastropods described in 1904